Solemn Communion is a 1977 French comedy-drama film directed by René Féret. It was entered into the 1977 Cannes Film Festival.

Cast

 Christian Drillaud as Young Charles Gravet
 Claude Bouchery as Jules Ternolain
 Isabelle Caillard as Young Josette Dauchy
 Patrick Fierry as Young François Dauchy
 Véronique Silver as Josette Dauchy at 40
 Marcel Dalio as Old Charles Gravet
 Myriam Boyer as Léone Gravet
 Manuel Strosser as Julien III Gravet
 André Marcon as Lucien Gravet
 Marief Guittier as Julie Ternolain at 25
 Claude-Emile Rosen as Honore Dauchy
 René Féret as Julien I Gravet at 30
 Andrée Tainsy as Charlotte
 Roland Amstutz as Raoul L'Homme, le fils naturel de François
 Monique Mélinand as Julie Ternolain at 45
 Vincent Pinel as Leon Gravet
 Ariane Ascaride as Palmyre
 Yveline Ailhaud as Marie
 Eric Lebel as Julien I Gravet as child
 Nathalie Baye as Jeanne Vanderberghe
 Gérard Chaillou as Marcel Dauchy
 Yves Reynaud as Gaston Gravet
 Fabienne Arel as Mathilde Ternolain
 Philippe Léotard as Jacques Gravet
 Jany Gastaldi as Lise Paulet-Dauchy at 20
 Monique Chaumette as Lise Paulet-Dauchy at 40
 Guillaume Lebel as Julien II Gravet
 Paul Descombes as Julien I Gravet at 50
 Olivier Caillard as Armand Gravet
 Pierre Forget as François Dauchy at 50
 Serge Reggiani as Récitant chanteur (voice)
 Alain Chevalier
 Philippe Nahon as a unionist

References

External links

1977 films
1977 comedy-drama films
1970s French-language films
French comedy-drama films
Films directed by René Féret
1970s French films